The Manzanita Band of Diegueño Mission Indians of the Manzanita Reservation is a federally recognized tribe of Kumeyaay Indians, who are sometimes known as part of the Mission Indians.

Culture 
Because the Manzanita Band is one of the Kumeyaay band of Indians, their culture has everything to do with the Kumeyaays. For example, Kumeyaay customs are passed through generations and they gather in both times of celebration and griefs. Kumeyaay Culture deals a lot with songs. Song showed them how to survive and contains the collective wisdom of the Kumeyaay. Some popular songs include the Bird Songs and the Eagle Dance. The social structure of the bands included the shiimull, which is an ancestral descent group, that is governed by a hierarchy of kwaaypaays. In 1769, when the Spanish arrived, there were around 50 and 75 shiimull, or bands existed. Each one of these bands included 5 to 15 family groups. Kumeyaay Indians also foraged for flora that they can use and hunt for animals depending on the season. Besides hunting for food, the Kumeyaay also planted trees and fields of grain, squash, beans and corn gathered and grew medicinal herbs and plants, and ate floras like fresh fruits, berries, pine nuts and acorn. They are also known for their basket weaving. The people had sophisticated practices of agriculture, plant and animal husbandry; maintained wild animal stocks, They also built dams and created watersheds that stored groundwater. Another thing was they also controlled erosion and overgrowth.

Reservation
The Manzanita Reservation is a federal Indian reservation located in the southern Laguna Mountains near Boulevard, in southeastern San Diego County, California. Through the authority of the Executive Order of 1891, the reservation was built on 640 acres of reserved land in 1893. In 1907 the reserve land was increased. The reservation is now currently   large with a population of approximately 67-69 and is held in a trust by the U.S. Government which meant the land is still technically owned by the US Government.

It was established in 1893. In 1973, 6 out of 69 enrolled members lived on the reservation. The reservation lies adjacent to both the Campo Indian Reservation and the La Posta Indian Reservation. The nearest off-reservation communities are Boulevard and Campo.

In the present day there are 13 small Kumeyaay Indian reservations in San Diego County, California; and 4 Kumiai Indio tribal community ranches in northern Baja California state, Mexico.

Government
The Manzanita Band is headquartered in Boulevard. Members of the Manzanita Band belongs to the Kumeyaay Nation. They are governed by a democratically elected tribal council. All tribal members that are 18 year olders and are on the council. The council then votes for who can be on the executive community, which includes the tribal chairman, two regular members, and a secretary-treasurer. Leroy J. Elliott was formally their tribal chairperson. Now the current acting Chairwoman is Angela Elliott Santos. The tribe itself is organized under the IRA constitution that was approved in 1976. Besides the executive council, the tribe also includes a housing community and management offices.

Education
The reservation is served by the Mountain Empire Unified School District.

References

Notes

Sources
 Eargle, Jr., Dolan H. California Indian Country: The Land and the People. San Francisco: Tree Company Press, 1992. .
 Pritzker, Barry M. A Native American Encyclopedia: History, Culture, and Peoples. Oxford: Oxford University Press, 2000. .
 Shipek, Florence C. "History of Southern California Mission Indians." Handbook of North American Indians. Volume ed. Heizer, Robert F. Washington, DC: Smithsonian Institution, 1978. 610-618. .`

External links
Southern California Tribal Chairman's Association—SCTCA.net: Manzanita Band of the Kumeyaay Nation webpage
Kumeyaay.info: The Kumeyaay Tribes Guide — Tribal Bands of the Kumeyaay Nation (Diegueño) — in San Diego County, California + Baja California state, México.

Kumeyaay
California Mission Indians
Federally recognized tribes in the United States
Laguna Mountains
Native American tribes in San Diego County, California
Native American tribes in California
Mountain Empire (San Diego County)